Robert Pierre René Marchand (18 August 1904 – 6 April 1982) was a French hurdler. He competed in the 110 m event at the 1928 Summer Olympics, but failed to reach the final.

References

1904 births
1982 deaths
French male hurdlers
Athletes (track and field) at the 1928 Summer Olympics
Olympic athletes of France
20th-century French people